Vennemann may refer to:
 Kevin Vennemann (born 1977, Dorsten, Germany), a German author
 Theo Vennemann (born 1937), a German linguist

Fenneman 

 George Watt Fenneman (1919 - 1997), an American radio and television announcer
 Nevin Melancthon Fenneman (1865–1945), American geologist

See also 
 Veneman, a Dutch surname

Low German surnames